The 2014 BBC Music Awards was the inaugural music award show, created out of the BBC's new strategy for music, BBC Music in 2014. The awards were held on 11 December 2014 at the Earls Court Exhibition Centre in London, which would be the final event to be broadcast from the venue. The awards show was announced on 16 June 2014.

The awards recognise the biggest and most exciting artists from the previous 12 months, as well as looking forward to new talent in 2015. A panel of judges decided the winners of each category, except 'Song of the Year', which was decided by the public.

Ed Sheeran, Pharrell Williams and Sam Smith all had two nominations apiece, with Williams winning two awards and Sheeran winning 'British Artist of the Year'.

Performances

Nominees and winners

Ratings 
The show achieved a total of 4.17 million viewers, making it the fifth most watched programme of the night. The show received higher ratings than the 2014 BRIT Awards earlier in the year, which achieved 3.84 million viewers, the lowest ratings in its history.

References

External links 
 

BBC music awards
BBC Music Awards
BBC Music awards